Little tree or Little Trees may refer to:

Art, entertainment, and media
Little Tree, a 1980 album by guitarist Ryo Kawasaki
Little Trees (band), a Danish Europop girl group
The Education of Little Tree, a 1976 memoir-style genre novel by Asa Earl Carter, also known as Forrest Carter
The Education of Little Tree (film), a 1997 film adapted from Forrest Carter's novel

Brands and enterprises
Little Trees, tree-shaped air fresheners